
1840s – 1850s – 1860s – 1870s – 1880s – 1890s – 1900s – 1910s – 1920s – 1930s – 1940s – 1950s – 1960s – 1970s – 1980s – 1990s – 2000s – 2010s – 2020s

2020s
2021 - 2020

2022 

 Liverpool win the EFL Cup for a record ninth time, beating Chelsea 11-10 on penalties.
 Roman Abramovich, owner of Chelsea, gets his bank account frozen and is forced to sell Chelsea.
 Liverpool win the FA Cup, beating Chelsea 6-5 on penalties.
 Manchester City win the league in dramatic fashion, after coming back from 0-2 against Aston Villa to win the league title.

2021
Chelsea win the UEFA Champions League, beating Manchester City 1-0 in the Final in Porto.
Leicester City win the FA Cup for the first time in their history.
In a season played behind closed doors, Manchester City win the EFL Cup for the fourth consecutive season and eighth in total, and their fifth Premier League title, seventh in the top flight overall.
Jack Grealish becomes the most expensive English footballer of all time after a transfer to Premier League champions Manchester City for 100 million pounds.

2020
 All football action stops in March, due to lockdown rules in the outbreak of the COVID-19 pandemic. It resumes on the 17th of July, behind closed doors.
 Liverpool win the Premier League for the first time, which marks their first national league title since 1990.
 Bury F.C. enter administration and are expelled from the Football League.

2010s
2019 – 2018 – 2017 – 2016 – 2015 – 2014 – 2013 – 2012 – 2011 – 2010

2019
 Manchester City become the first team to win back-to-back Premier League titles since Manchester United in 2009.
 Liverpool pick up their 6th European Cup, winning the UEFA Champions League in Madrid against Tottenham Hotspur.
 Manchester City become the first English team to win a domestic treble (FA Cup, EFL Cup and Premier League).

2018
Manchester City win the Premier League title and become the Centurions, the first club to win the Premier League with 100 points.  During the season they break multiple all-time Premier League and Top Division records.
 In League One, the two offshoot clubs of Wimbledon, AFC Wimbledon and Milton Keynes Dons, end the 2017–18 season with different fates, with AFCW surviving and MK Dons relegated to League Two. This means that the 2018–19 season will be the first in which AFCW will play in a higher division than MK Dons.
Chelsea win the FA Cup, beating Manchester United 1-0 in extra time.

2017
 Arsène Wenger becomes the most successful manager in FA Cup history, winning his 7th FA Cup. Arsenal reclaim the record of most FA Cup titles with 13.
 Arsenal fail to qualify for the UEFA Champions League for the first time since 1997.
 Former Lincoln City, Watford, Aston Villa and England manager Graham Taylor dies aged 72.
Chelsea win their fifth Premier League title, and sixth English title, achieving a record of 30 wins, in Antonio Conte's first season in English football.
Jose Mourinho becomes the only Manchester United manager to win a major trophy in his first season, as he guides the club to a League Cup and Europa League double.

2016
 The Football League renames itself as the English Football League, with all of the leagues and cup competitions it organises including "EFL" in their titles.
 Manchester United equal Arsenal's record 12 FA Cups. 
 Leicester City win the top tier title of English football for the first time in history, with one British sports book having offered preseason odds of 5000/1 against their winning the title, just 8 years after their relegation to the 3rd tier.
 Leicester City's Jamie Vardy became the first player to score in 11 consecutive appearances in Premier League history.
Defending champions Chelsea sack manager José Mourinho in December while in 16th place and eventually fail to qualify for European football, for the first time in two decades, finishing 10th, the lowest position for a Premier League holder. This record only stood for one year, as Leicester City finished 12th the following season. Eden Hazard, the previous season's PFA Players' Player of the Year, did not score a league goal until late April.
Manchester United sack manager Louis van Gaal despite winning the FA Cup, after a poor league season which sees the club miss out on next season's Champions League. Former Chelsea manager Jose Mourinho is appointed in his place.

2015
Arsenal win the FA Cup for a record twelfth time.
Chelsea win the Premier League in Jose Mourinho's return to the club.
AFC Bournemouth plays in the Premier League for the first time after winning the Football League Championship.

2014
19 May: Louis van Gaal is confirmed as manager of Manchester United. Former interim manager Ryan Giggs is named as his assistant, and confirms his retirement as a player at the age of 40 after nearly a quarter of a century during which he played 963 games and won an English record of 22 major trophies.
 Arsenal win the FA Cup, their first major trophy in 9 years.
 Manchester City win their 2nd Premier League title.

2013
Alex Ferguson retires after winning Manchester United's 20th league title.
Wigan Athletic win the FA Cup for the first time, but are relegated from the Premier League, becoming the first FA Cup winners to be relegated in the same season as their Cup win.
Swansea City wins the Football League Cup for the first time and becomes the first Welsh club to represent the English football league system in European tournaments.
Gareth Bale signs for Real Madrid for an £85.3 million transfer fee.

2012
Liverpool win the League Cup on penalties in the return of former manager Kenny Dalglish.
Manchester City wins the Premier League title ahead of rivals Manchester United on goal difference, their 3rd overall English league win, and becomes the first team relegated from the Premier League to win the title. This was also their first English league title success since 1968.
Chelsea wins the UEFA Champions League for the first time in their history, beating F.C. Bayern Munich in the Allianz Arena on penalties. They also win the FA Cup.

2011
Manchester United win a record-setting 19th top-flight title. They also reach the Champions League final at Wembley Stadium, but lose to Barcelona for the second time in three years.
Manchester City won the 130th FA Cup Final beating Stoke City 1–0 at Wembley, claiming a major trophy after 36 years.
Birmingham City claim the second major trophy in their history after beating Arsenal in the League Cup Final.
On Saturday, 5 February there were 41 goals from 8 Premier League games which was the record for a single day in the Premier League since it became a 20-team division. The results were Aston Villa 2–2 Fulham, Everton 5–3 Blackpool, Manchester City 3–0 West Brom, Newcastle 4–4 Arsenal, Stoke 3–2 Sunderland, Tottenham 2–1 Bolton, Wigan 4–3 Blackburn, Wolves 2–1 Manchester United.
Chelsea sign Fernando Torres from Liverpool for a British record £50 million.
 Manager Carlo Ancelotti is sacked despite winning the League and Cup double for Chelsea the previous season.

2010
Manchester United defend their League Cup title.
 Liverpool fail to qualify for the UEFA Champions League for the first time since 2003. Tottenham Hotspur break into the top four of the Premier League for the first time, thus taking Liverpool's spot in Europe's top club competition.
 Chelsea become the seventh team to win the league and FA Cup double, scoring a record 108 Premier League goals in the process.

2000s
2009 – 2008 – 2007 – 2006 – 2005 – 2004 – 2003 – 2002 – 2001 – 2000

2009
Manchester United become the first team to win three consecutive top division titles on more than one occasion, equalling Liverpool's long-standing record of 18 league titles. They also win the third Football League Cup of their history but endure disappointment when losing 2–0 to FC Barcelona of Spain in the UEFA Champions League final.
Cardiff City leave Ninian Park after 100 years and relocate to a new 27,000-seat stadium nearby.
Cristiano Ronaldo, a Portuguese forward, becomes the most expensive footballer in the world when Manchester United sell him to the Spanish giants Real Madrid for £80million.
Sir Bobby Robson, who guided Ipswich Town to FA Cup glory in 1978 and UEFA Cup glory in 1981, as well as guiding the England team to the semi-finals of the 1990 World Cup, dies of cancer aged 76.
Chester City, the Conference team who were relegated from The Football League last year, go out of business after 125 years in existence. They are reformed as Chester and will initially compete in a regional division.
Having been deducted a record 30 points for financial irregularities before the start of the season, Luton Town are relegated to the Conference and become the first club to fall to that level after three successive relegations.

2008
Portsmouth beat Cardiff City 1–0 in the FA Cup final, winning the competition for the first time in 49 years, the longest gap between two FA Cup wins for the same club.
In early September, both Kevin Keegan and Alan Curbishley walk out of their Premier League management jobs, citing boardroom interference in transfers. In the same week, Dimitar Berbatov completes a move to Manchester United against the wishes of the Tottenham Hotspur board. Manchester City were purchased by the Abu Dhabi United Group and on the same day broke the transfer record by purchasing Robinho of Brazil for £32million – slightly exceeding the £30.75million that their city rivals paid for Berbatov.
Three clubs start the Football League Two season with points deductions. Both Rotherham United and AFC Bournemouth started the season on −17 points after exiting administration without using a Company Voluntary Agreement.  Luton Town started on −30 points after a 20-point deduction due to exiting administration without using a CVA and a 10-point deduction due to illegal agent payments during transfers.  This 30-point deduction doubled the previous record points deduction imposed on a club in 2007.
Manchester United win the Premier League for the 10th time and overall 17th English League Championship. It is also the tenth title for manager Sir Alex Ferguson (now the longest serving manager in English football with 22 years of unbroken service at the club) and Ryan Giggs, the only player to have collected title medals with all 10 of their championship winning sides since 1993.
Tottenham Hotspur beat Chelsea 2–1 after extra time in the first final of the Football League Cup to be held at the new Wembley Stadium
Fabio Capello succeeds Steve McClaren as head coach of the England national football team.
Derby became the first Premier League side to be relegated in March.
The 2008 UEFA Champions League Final is the first all-English club final in European Cup/Champions League history
In the first all-English European Cup final, Manchester United beat Chelsea on penalties after a 1–1 draw in Moscow, Russia.
Leicester City are relegated to the third tier of English football for the first time in their 124-year history.
Aldershot Town win promotion to the Football League as Conference National champions, 16 years after the old Aldershot club went out of business.
Hull City A.F.C. reach Premier League for the first time in their history beating Bristol City F.C. 1–0 at Wembley Stadium.

2007
Luton Town F.C. enter administration on 22 November thus incurring a 10-point deduction for the 2007–08 season.
Steve McClaren is fired from the job as England manager after failing to qualify for Euro 2008 – the first time in 24 years that England have failed to qualify for the European Championships.
Leeds United are hit with the biggest point deduction yet in English professional football history on 4 August after the club was sold without a C.V.A. after entering administration, required by league rules. This penalty was applied for the 2007–08 season meaning Leeds would start the season on minus 15 points.
Manchester United win the Premiership for the ninth time under Sir Alex Ferguson.
Chelsea win a cup double winning the FA Cup in the first final back at the recently completed Wembley Stadium. The match however was not one of the better finals to ever have graced the Wembley turf and finished 1–0.  Didier Drogba scored the only goal in the last minute of extra-time.  Ryan Giggs set a new record for the player to appear in the most finals. However, he could not beat Mark Hughes' record for the most finals won by one player.  The victory by Chelsea stopped Manchester United from winning the Double.
Leeds United enter administration on 4 May after a number of years struggling with the debt incurred by previous boards, thus incurring a 10-point deduction for the 2006–07 season.
Boston United enter administration in the final minutes of the league season to take a 10-point deduction in the 2006–07 season. They are relegated two divisions to the Conference North.
Chelsea become League Cup champions after beating Arsenal 2–1 at the Millennium Stadium.  This was also the last major English Cup Final to be played at the Millennium Stadium before the move back to Wembley Stadium after its completion.
 The Arsenal women become the first (and to date only) English club to win the competition now known as the UEFA Women's Champions League, winning the UEFA Women's Cup Final against Swedish side Umeå 1–0 on aggregate.
American tycoons George N. Gillett Jr. and Tom Hicks pay £174.1m to take over Liverpool.
Alan Ball Jr., member of England's World Cup winning team of 1966, dies of a heart attack aged 61.

2006
Doug Ellis sells Aston Villa to American billionaire Randy Lerner for £64million.
John Terry succeeds David Beckham as England's national team captain. Liverpool's Steven Gerrard is named vice-captain.
Sven-Göran Eriksson announces that he will step down as England manager following the 2006 World Cup. He will be succeeded by Steve McClaren with effect from 1 August.
Chelsea win the Premiership for the second year in succession.
Thierry Henry scores the last goal, and the last hat trick, in the final game at Highbury before Arsenal move to their new 60,000-seat Emirates Stadium
Manchester United win the League Cup for the second time in their history beating Wigan Athletic 4–0 at the Millennium Stadium.
Middlesbrough reach the UEFA Cup final for the first time in their history, only to be beaten 4–0 by Sevilla.
Peter Osgood, who won FA Cups with Chelsea and Southampton in the 1970s, dies of a heart attack aged 59.
Charlton Athletic become the first Premiership club to change their shirt design mid-season due to the collapse of former sponsors Allsports.
Alan Shearer retires two weeks early following a knee injury. After a professional career that lasted almost 20 years, the former England and Newcastle captain bows out as the Premiership's leading goal scorer of all time with 260 goals in 441 games but only one trophy, the 1994–95 Premiership title.
Sunderland are relegated from the Premiership, and break their own record set three years earlier for the lowest points accumulated, ending the season with just 15 points. They also set a new record low of just 3 wins.
Reading are promoted to the Premiership, for the first time in their history, after winning the Football League Championship with a record 106 points.
Liverpool beat West Ham 3–1 on penalties in the 125th FA Cup final after the game finished 3–3 in normal time. It is the last FA Cup game at the Millennium Stadium before Wembley re-opens.
Arsenal's first UEFA Champions League final sees Jens Lehmann become the first player dismissed in a final as FC Barcelona win 2–1. The club also play their last season at Highbury after 93 years, and relocate to the new 60,000-seat Emirates Stadium at nearby Ashburton Grove.
The players of Aston Villa make history on 14 July by issuing a joint statement critical of chairman Doug Ellis, the first-ever time such a statement has been formally issued to the press by a collective of players from any English football club.
In their first season as a top division club and only their 28th in the professional leagues, Wigan Athletic finish tenth (having spent much of the season in the top five) and are League Cup runners-up to Manchester United who beat them 4–0 in the final.
Oxford United, the 1986 League Cup winners and members of the First Division from 1985 to 1988, become the first former winners of a major trophy to be relegated to the Conference.

2005
Liverpool defeat CSKA Moscow 3–2 after extra time to win the European Super Cup for a third time, an English record.
Liverpool win the Champions League for the fifth time, an English record, on penalties, after drawing 3–3 with A.C. Milan in Istanbul
Chelsea win the Premier League title as they set a new Premier League record for fewest goals conceded (15) and most points attained (95).
Arsenal become the first team to win the FA Cup on penalties when they triumph over Manchester United in the shootout after a goalless draw.
George Best, widely regarded one of the greatest footballers in the history of Manchester United and the footballing world, dies aged 59 after a short illness.
Wigan Athletic reach the top division for the first time in their history after finishing runners-up in the Football League Championship, mirroring Fulham's achievement four years previously of having made their way from League Two to the Premier League.
Coventry City move into the new 32,500-seat Ricoh Arena after 106 years at the Highfield Road stadium.
The Glazer takeover of Manchester United leads to disgruntled fans creating F.C. United of Manchester.
Swansea City leave the Vetch Field after 93 years and relocate to a new 22,000-seat stadium in the city. They bow out at the Vetch on a high note with promotion from League Two.
Former England internationals Jamie Redknapp and Graeme Le Saux retire from playing, their careers going out on a low note as their club Southampton drop out of the top flight after 27 years.
Barnet are promoted back to the Football League after four years away, along with Carlisle United who return after just one season.

2004
Arsenal are crowned Premiership champions after going a 38-game league season unbeaten, earning the nickname The Invincibles.
Manchester United win the FA Cup for a record eleventh time.
Divisions One, Two and Three of The Football League are renamed the Football League Championship, League One and League Two respectively as part of a rebranding exercise.
Everton striker Wayne Rooney, still only 18, becomes the world's most expensive teenager when he signs for Manchester United in a transfer deal which could eventually rise to £25million from an initial £20million.
Middlesbrough beat Bolton Wanderers 2–1 in the League Cup final to win the first major trophy in their 128-year history.
Carlisle United, who spent one season in the First Division during the 1970s, become the first former members of the top flight to be relegated to the Conference after 76 years of league membership. They go down with York City, who have played in the top flight for 75 years and eliminated several top clubs (notably Arsenal, Manchester United and Everton) from the top flight in cup competitions.
Brian Clough, the legendary manager who guided Derby County to a League title & Nottingham Forest to League & European Glory, dies of stomach cancer aged 69.
Bill Nicholson, the legendary former Tottenham Hotspur manager, dies aged 85.
Wimbledon become Milton Keynes Dons to reflect their new location.

2003
Liverpool win the League Cup for a record seventh time.
Arsenal win the FA Cup Final by beating Southampton 1–0
Chelsea are bought by Russian billionaire Roman Abramovich in an English record takeover deal worth £150 million.
Manchester United overhaul Arsenal during the final weeks of the season to claim their eighth Premiership title in eleven seasons.
Sunderland confirm themselves as statistically the worst Premiership team ever after they are relegated with a record low of 4 wins, 19 points and 21 goals.
Leicester City win promotion to the Premiership as Division One runners-up despite having started the season in receivership with £30 million debts and a transfer embargo.
Manchester City leave Maine Road after 80 years and move into the 48,000-seat City of Manchester Stadium which had been constructed for the previous year's Commonwealth Games.
Darlington, the Division Three club, leave the Feethams after 120 years and relocate to a new 25,000-seat stadium in the south of the town.
Marc-Vivien Foé, the Manchester City midfielder, collapses and dies while playing in the semi-final of the Confederations Cup for Cameroon in France. Foé, 28, also played for West Ham United earlier in his career.
Wimbledon relocate to Milton Keynes and set up a temporary home in the National Hockey Stadium until a new permanent stadium is built.

2002
Arsenal join Manchester United as the second club to have won three league championship/FA Cup doubles.
West Bromwich Albion and Birmingham City win promotion to the Premiership, ending an exile from the top flight which both clubs had begun in 1986.
Mobile phone operator MM02 replaces SEGA as Arsenal's shirt sponsor.
Leicester City leave Filbert Street after 111 years and relocate to the 32,000-seat Walkers Stadium.
Manchester United break the British transfer record once again by paying Leeds United £29million for central defender Rio Ferdinand.
 On 16 March, a First Division match between Sheffield United and West Bromwich Albion degenerates into one of the most violent in English football history, featuring multiple on-field assaults and ending with abandonment when United, trailing 3–0 at the time, were left with 6 players. This match enters English football lore as the Battle of Bramall Lane.
Alan Shearer hits his 200th Premiership goal against Chalton Athletic at St. James' Park on 20 April 2002.
Everton become the first team to have spent 100 seasons in the top flight of English football.
The FA approves the plan of Wimbledon to move to Milton Keynes. The move is extremely unpopular with the club's fans, who form a breakaway club called AFC Wimbledon. The new club is playing at a much lower level (Combined Counties League) than the original one, who are competing in Division One, but the new Wimbledon club is soon enjoying the highest attendance.
Brighton & Hove Albion become only the seventh club in English football history to win back-to-back promotion championships after winning the 2001–02 League One title (having won the 2000–01 League Two title the season before).

2001
Manchester United become only the fourth English club to win three successive league championships, following Huddersfield Town in the 1920s, Arsenal in the 1930s, and Liverpool in the 1980s.
Liverpool complete a unique treble of the FA Cup, League Cup and UEFA Cup.
David Rocastle, who won a League Cup and two league championships with Arsenal as well as never being on the losing side in his 14 England appearances, dies of cancer aged 33.
Paul Vaessen who famously scored the winning goal for Arsenal against Juventus at the Stadio Comunale, in the second leg of a Cup Winners' Cup semi-final on 23 April 1980, (the first time an English club had beaten Juventus in Turin), dies of a drug overdose at the age of 39, He had led a troubled life since injury resulted in his premature retirement from football in 1983 aged just 21.  He was known as "a forgotten hero" as his death gained no media coverage at all, announcements of Paul's death in his local free newspaper omitted the fact that he had formerly been a footballer and merely labeled him a "local addict".
Coventry City suffer relegation from the Premiership after 34 successive seasons of top-flight football.
Fulham are promoted to the Premiership, becoming the first club since the Premier League's formation to have made their way from Division Three (now League Two) to the top flight.
Stan Cullis, legendary former player and manager of Wolverhampton Wanderers, dies aged 85.
Bertie Mee, managed of Arsenal's 1971 double-winning team, dies aged 82.
Les Sealey, who kept goal for Manchester United in their FA Cup triumph of 1990 and the European Cup Winners' Cup triumph of 1991, dies of a heart attack aged 43.
Oxford United leave the Manor Ground after 76 years and relocate to the new 12,500-seat Kassam Stadium (named after chairman Firoz Kassam) at Blackbird Leys, while Southampton end 103 years at The Dell and move into their new 32,000-seat St Mary's Stadium – which holds more than twice as many spectators as their old ground.
Manchester United break the national transfer fee record twice – first by paying PSV Eindhoven £19million for Dutch striker Ruud van Nistelrooy, and then by paying Lazio of Italy £28.1million for Argentine midfielder Juan Sebastián Verón.

2000
FA Cup holders Manchester United decline to defend their trophy, instead electing to take part in the inaugural FIFA Club World Championship—Darlington become the lucky losers who take their place in the Third Round draw.
England lose 1–0 to Germany in their opening qualifier for the 2002 World Cup, in a game which is also the last game at Wembley Stadium before it closes its doors after 77 years for a complete revamp. The historic goal is scored by Dietmar Hamann.
Kevin Keegan resigns after England's defeat and is succeeded by Lazio's Swedish coach Sven-Göran Eriksson – the first foreigner to take charge of the England team.
Chelsea beat Aston Villa 1–0 to win the last FA Cup final at Wembley before its reconstruction.
Sir Stanley Matthews, legendary former England, Blackpool and Stoke City winger, dies after a short illness at the age of 85.
The new home of Welsh football is the 72,000-seat Millennium Stadium, which stands on the site of Cardiff Arms Park, and will host all English cup finals and playoff finals until Wembley is reopened.
After guiding Leicester City to their second Football League Cup victory in two seasons, manager Martin O'Neill moves north of the border to manage Celtic in the Scottish Premier League.
Alan Knight, 39-year-old goalkeeper, retires after playing 801 games for Portsmouth since 1978.
Wimbledon are relegated from the Premier League after 14 years in the top flight.

1990s
1999 – 1998 – 1997 – 1996 – 1995 – 1994 – 1993 – 1992 – 1991 – 1990

1999
Manchester United complete a unique treble of the Premier League title, FA Cup and European Cup, and manager Alex Ferguson is honoured with a knighthood.
On-loan goalkeeper Jimmy Glass scores an injury-time winner for Carlisle United on the last day of the season to preserve their league status and relegate Scarborough.
Bradford City finish runners-up in Division One to end their 77-year absence from the top flight of English football.
Glenn Hoddle is sacked as England manager after a controversial newspaper interview. He is replaced by Kevin Keegan.
Sir Alf Ramsey, manager of the 1966 England World Cup winning team, dies from Alzheimer's disease at the age of 79.
On Boxing Day, Chelsea become the first British side to field an entirely foreign (non-UK) line-up in a Premier League match against Southampton.
Division One champions Sunderland set an English professional league record of 105 points.
Blackburn Rovers are relegated from the Premier League just four years after being champions.
Cheltenham Town are promoted to the Football League as Conference champions.
Wigan Athletic, who have played at Springfield Park since their formation in 1932, relocate to the new 25,000-seat JJB Stadium.

1998

Arsenal equal Manchester United's record of two league championship and FA Cup doubles in their first full season under the management of Frenchman Arsène Wenger, who was also the first foreign manager to win the English top flight. 
Chelsea complete a double of the Cup Winners' Cup and League Cup within four months of Gianluca Vialli taking charge of team affairs following Ruud Gullit's dismissal, which follows a dispute with chairman Ken Bates over transfer funds.
Doncaster Rovers F.C. are relegated from the Football League with a record of 34 league defeats.
Manchester City are relegated to the third tier of the English league for the first time in their history.
Halifax Town win the Conference title and are promoted back to the Football League after five years away.
Reading leave Elm Park after 102 years and relocate to the 25,000-seat Madejski Stadium named after chairman John Madejski.
England go out of the World Cup in France after losing on penalties to Argentina after a 2–2 draw.
Charlton Athletic win promotion to the Premier League by beating Sunderland 7–6 on penalties after a 4–4 draw in the Division One playoff final at Wembley.

1997
After captaining Manchester United to their fourth Premiership title in five seasons and 11th English League Championship overall, Eric Cantona announces his retirement as a player.
Ruud Gullit becomes the first foreign manager to win an English trophy after his Chelsea side defeated Middlesbrough 2–0 in the FA Cup final to end their 26-year trophy drought.
Middlesbrough experience a unique season. They are on the losing side in both domestic cup finals and have a 3-point deduction imposed for postponing a Premiership fixture at short notice seeing them relegated in second from bottom place – so they finished in the last two of all three major English competitions.
Alan Shearer is ruled out of football for seven months after suffering a broken ankle in a pre-season game.
Kevin Keegan shocks Newcastle United by resigning as manager just after the turn of the New Year. He felt that he could take the club no further, and is succeeded by Kenny Dalglish.
Bolton Wanderers move into the Reebok Stadium, leaving Burnden Park, their home for 102 years.
Sunderland end 99 years at Roker Park and move to the 42,000-seat Stadium of Light on the banks of the River Wear.
Derby County relocate to Pride Park Stadium after 101 years at the Baseball Ground.
After a record 119 years at the Victoria Ground, Stoke City relocate to the 28,000-seat Britannia Stadium.
Brighton & Hove Albion, FA Cup runners-up 14 years ago, avoid relegation to the Conference by drawing 1–1 away with Hereford United, who go down instead, on the last day of the Division Three season.
Billy Bremner, legendary Leeds United captain of the 1960s and 1970s, dies of a heart attack aged 54.

1996
Manchester United win a unique second league championship and FA Cup double. Following taunts that "You win nothing with kids", the young team hits back by achieving something that no English team has done before.
Alan Shearer becomes the world's first £15-million player when he leaves Blackburn Rovers to join his hometown club Newcastle United.
England hosts the European Championships for the first time and reach the semi-finals, losing 6–5 on penalties after a 1–1 draw.
Terry Venables steps down after two-and-a-half years as England manager after the European Championships and is replaced by Glenn Hoddle.
Bob Paisley, who won a record 21 prizes in nine seasons as Liverpool manager, died, aged 77, after a long illness.
Aston Villa win the League Cup for a record-equaling fifth time, against Leeds United 3–0.
Goalkeeper Peter Shilton plays his 1000th career league game for Leyton Orient against Brighton & Hove Albion.
Bristol Rovers end a decade of ground-sharing with non-league Bath City and move back to Bristol to play at the Memorial Ground, home of the local rugby team.

1995
Manchester United's French striker Eric Cantona is banned from football for 8 months and sentenced to 120 hours community service for kicking a Crystal Palace spectator at Selhurst Park. Chelsea captain Dennis Wise is convicted of assaulting a taxi driver. Arsenal's Paul Merson and Crystal Palace's Chris Armstrong both undergo rehab after it is revealed that Merson has a cocaine addiction and alcoholism, while Armstrong had failed a drugs test. Arsenal's manager George Graham is sacked following revelations that he had accepted £425,000 in illegal payments in 1992 in connection with the acquisition of Pal Lydersen and John Jensen.
Kenny Dalglish becomes the third manager to win the English league with different clubs after Blackburn Rovers clinch the Premiership title to top the English league for the first time since 1914.
A Paul Rideout goal gives Everton a 1–0 victory over Manchester United in the FA Cup final to leave Alex Ferguson's men without a major trophy for the first time since 1989.
Bobby Stokes, who scored Southampton's winning goal in their shock win over Manchester United in the 1976 FA Cup final, dies suddenly at the age of 44.
Manchester United break the English record in January by paying Newcastle United £7 million for striker Andy Cole. Five months later the record is broken again when Arsenal pay Internazionale £7.5million for Dutch striker Dennis Bergkamp. Bergkamp's record is almost instantly broken when Liverpool sign Nottingham Forest striker Stan Collymore for £8.5million.
Middlesbrough leave their Ayresome Park home for the Riverside Stadium, the first stadium designed and constructed to comply with the Taylor Report.
West Ham United celebrate their centenary.
Middlesbrough, Division One champions, leave Ayresome Park after 92 years and move to the new 30,000-seat Riverside Stadium on the banks of the River Tees. They return to the Premier League as the first top division club to move into a new stadium since Manchester City moved into Maine Road in 1923.

1994
Manchester United become only the fourth club in the 20th century to win the league championship and FA Cup double. They achieve this triumph just four months after the death of former manager Sir Matt Busby at the age of 84. They are denied an unprecedented 'treble' by Aston Villa, who defeat them in the final of the League Cup.
Blackburn Rovers break the English transfer fee record by paying Norwich City £5 million for 21-year-old striker Chris Sutton.
Club and former England captain Bryan Robson leaves Manchester United after 13 years to become player-manager of Middlesbrough.
Tottenham Hotspur are found guilty of financial irregularities dating back to the 1980s and handed the most severe punishment in the history of English football: a £600,000 fine, 12 league points deducted and a one-year ban from the FA Cup. The points deduction and the FA Cup ban are later quashed but the fine is increased to a new record of £1.5million.
Billy Wright, former captain of Wolverhampton Wanderers and England, dies of cancer aged 70.
Huddersfield Town end 86 years at Leeds Road and move into their new 20,000-seat Alfred McAlpine Stadium.
Northampton Town relocate to Sixfields Stadium after 97 years at the County Ground.
Liverpool's famous Spion Kop is demolished to make way for a new all-seater stand, as is Aston Villa's Holte End, as standing accommodation is banned from Premier League stadiums.

1993
Manchester United win the inaugural Premiership title to end their 26-year wait for the league championship. They strengthened themselves for the defence of their big prize by paying a British record fee of £3.75million for Nottingham Forest's young Irish midfielder Roy Keane.
Arsenal become the first club to win the FA Cup and League Cup in the same season, after beating Sheffield Wednesday 2–1 in both finals.
Tony Barton, who managed Aston Villa to European Cup glory in 1982, dies of a heart attack aged 56.
Graham Taylor quits as England manager after the nation's failure to qualify for the 1994 FIFA World Cup and is succeeded by Terry Venables.
Bobby Moore, captain of England's 1966 World Cup winning team, dies at the age of 51.
Millwall leave The Den after 83 years and relocate to the 20,000-seat stadium The New Den.
Wycombe Wanderers, managed by the former Nottingham Forest player Martin O'Neill, win the GM Vauxhall Conference title and take the place of Halifax Town in Division Three.
Brian Clough retires as manager of Nottingham Forest after 18 years in charge, and goes out on a low note as Forest are relegated from the Premier League.
Norwich City finish third in the Premier League and qualify for the UEFA Cup, where they famously eliminate Bayern Munich in the second round before being beaten by Inter Milan in the next round.
Newcastle United are promoted back to the top flight after a four-year exile.

1992
The Football Association creates the FA Premier League, an elite league of 22 clubs that replaces the old Football League First Division as England's highest division.
Manchester United win the Football League Cup for the first time in their history, beating four-time winners Nottigham Forest in the final.
Blackburn Rovers, back in the top flight for the first time since the 1960s, make Alan Shearer England's most expensive footballer by paying Southampton £3.5million for his services.
Leeds United win the last Football League First Division championship before the creation of the FA Premier League.
Liverpool win the FA Cup for the fifth time in their centenary year.
Aldershot, who have struggled to stay afloat for two years, finally go out of business on 25 March. Maidstone United follow suit on 17 August after their financial crisis leaves them with no option but to quit the Football League.
Eight years after retiring as a player, Kevin Keegan returns to football as manager of Newcastle United and saves them from Second Division relegation.
Chester City move into their new Deva Stadium, having ground-shared with Macclesfield Town for two years since leaving Sealand Road.
Gary Lineker retires from international football with 48 goals to his name for England – just one goal short of the record set by Bobby Charlton. He also calls time on his career in England, joining Nagoya Grampus of Japan.
England are eliminated from Euro 92 in the group stages after losing their final group game 2–1 to host nation Sweden.
After a slow start to the new Premier League campaign puts their league title hopes under serious doubt, Manchester United pay Leeds United £1.2million for French striker Eric Cantona in hope of winning a title race which by late November is being led by the likes of Aston Villa and Norwich City.
Paul Gascoigne joins Lazio of Italy in a £5.5million move from Tottenham Hotspur.

1991
Arsenal win the Football League title with just one defeat from 38 fixtures.
Manchester United mark the comeback of English clubs in European competition by beating FC Barcelona 2–1 in the Cup Winners' Cup final.
Liverpool are readmitted to European competition and, as First Division runners-up are entered into the UEFA Cup for the 1991–92 season.
After three years with French side AS Monaco, Glenn Hoddle returns to England to become player-manager of Swindon Town.
Dean Saunders becomes the most expensive player in English footballer when he is transferred from Derby County to Liverpool in a £2.9million deal.
Tottenham Hotspur win the FA Cup for a record eighth time, beating Nottingham Forest 2–1 in the final, but midfielder Paul Gascoigne is ruled out for a year with a knee injury suffered early in the game.
Aston Villa and England midfielder David Platt joins Italian side Bari for £6.5million.
Barnet are promoted to the Football League as Conference champions.
Kenny Dalglish resigns as Liverpool manager on 22 February, and returns to football as manager of Second Division side Blackburn Rovers on 12 October following the club's takeover by wealthy local steel baron Jack Walker.

1990
Liverpool win their eighteenth top-flight title, which will be their last for the next 30 years.
England reach the semi-finals of the World Cup before losing to eventual winners Germany on penalties after a 1–1 draw. Manager Bobby Robson resigns after the competition to take charge of Dutch side PSV Eindhoven and is succeeded by Aston Villa manager Graham Taylor, who in turn is replaced by Czech coach Jozef Venglos – the first manager in the top flight of English football from outside of the British Isles.
English clubs are readmitted to European competition after a five-year ban arising from the Heysel Stadium disaster. First Division runners-up, Aston Villa, qualify for the UEFA Cup whilst FA Cup winners, Manchester United, qualify for the Cup Winners' Cup. Champions Liverpool are unable to compete in the European Cup because they have to serve an extra year of the ban.
Leeds United won the Second Division championship to end their eight-year exile from the First Division.
York City striker David Longhurst collapses and dies in his side's Fourth Division home fixture against Lincoln City at Bootham Crescent.
AFC Bournemouth director Brian Tiler, a former Aston Villa player, is killed in a car crash. Manager Harry Redknapp is also involved in the crash but survived.
Play-off finals become one-legged matches played at Wembley. In the Second Division, Swindon Town beat Sunderland 1–0 but stay in the Second Division after being found guilty of financial irregularities, with Sunderland being promoted in their place.
Manchester United win their first major trophy under the management of Alex Ferguson, beating Crystal Palace 1–0 in the FA Cup final replay after drawing the first match 3–3.
Peter Shilton retires from international football at the age of 40, kept goal a record 125 caps for the country.
Manchester United and Arsenal were respectively deducted 1 and 2 points, for a 21-man brawl involving their players on the pitch.  The first and, so far, the only instances in English league history where a team were docked points for player misconduct.

1980s
1989 – 1988 – 1987 – 1986 – 1985 – 1984 – 1983 – 1982 – 1981 – 1980

1989
Arsenal win the league championship for the first time in 18 years, in the final minute of the final game of the season from Michael Thomas, giving them a 2–0 away win over nearest rivals Liverpool to snatch the title on goals scored, with both teams goal difference being equal.
94 Liverpool fans die on 15 April after being crushed on the terraces at Hillsborough, where Liverpool were taking on Nottingham Forest in the FA Cup semi-final. The final death toll for the disaster was 97.
Liverpool go on to win the FA Cup with a 3–2 extra-time victory over Everton at Wembley. Ian Rush, who scored twice in the 1986 all-Merseyside final triumph, does so again.
John Lyall's 15-year reign as West Ham manager comes to an end after they are relegated from the First Division.
Newport County go out of business on 27 February and are then expelled from the Football Conference for failing to fulfill their fixtures.
Leeds United's most successful ever manager, Don Revie, dies on 26 May from motor neurone disease aged 61.
Peter Shilton becomes the most capped England international when he wins his 109th cap beating Bobby Moore's record.
Nottingham Forest end their nine-year wait for a major trophy by winning the Football League Cup.
Alex Ferguson makes a host of big-money signings for Manchester United in his latest attempt to win them their first league title since 1967, paying a total of more than £7 million for Mike Phelan, Neil Webb, Paul Ince, Gary Pallister and Danny Wallace.
Gary Lineker returns to English football after three years in Spain with FC Barcelona when he joins Tottenham Hotspur for £1.1million.

1988
Liverpool wrap up their seventeenth league title after losing just two league games in a 40-game season.
Wimbledon beat Liverpool 1–0 to win the FA Cup in one of the most dramatic finals seen at Wembley. The triumph came at the end of Wimbledon's 11th season as a Football League club and only their second as First Division members.
Luton Town win the first major trophy of their history by beating Arsenal 3–2 in the League Cup final.
Jackie Milburn, former Newcastle United striker, dies of cancer at the age of 64.
Lincoln City, the first club to suffer automatic relegation from the Football League, regain their league status at the first time of asking by clinching the Football Conference title.
Paul Gascoigne, 21-year-old Newcastle United midfielder, becomes England's first £2 million footballer when he signs for Tottenham Hotspur.
Shortly after Gascoigne's transfer, the national transfer fee record is broken again when Everton pay £2.2million for West Ham United striker Tony Cottee.
Ian Rush returns to Liverpool after an unsuccessful season at Juventus in Italy for £2.8million – the third time in the space of a few weeks that the record fee paid by an English club is broken.
Billy Bonds, the oldest outfield player in the Football League at 41, retires from playing with West Ham United.
Mark Hughes returns to Manchester United after two years away for a fee of £1.8million.
Portsmouth are relegated to the Second Division a year after promotion.

1987
Tottenham manager David Pleat resigns after rumours in the media that he has been involved in a vice ring. He is replaced by Terry Venables.
Coventry City win the first major trophy in their history by beating Tottenham Hotspur (unbeaten in their previous seven finals) 3–2 in the FA Cup final.
Everton win their ninth league title in adversity after struggling with massive injuries all season, still managing to win the league by 11 clear points.
Lincoln City become the first English club to suffer automatic relegation from the Football League after the re-election system is scrapped. They are replaced by Conference champions Scarborough.
The Football League introduces play-offs to settle the final promotion place initially including one team from the higher division.
Former Aston Villa and Wales midfielder Trevor Hockey dies of a heart attack at the age of 43.
Arsenal become the first team to defeat Liverpool in a game in which Ian Rush had scored by defeating them 2–1 at Wembley in the League Cup Final.
Liverpool are forced to play their first few games of the season away from home after a sewer collapses below the Spion Kop terrace.
Ian Rush moves to Juventus, as agreed in his deal the previous summer.
Portsmouth are promoted back to the First Division after 29 years away.
Alex Ferguson begins to rebuild Manchester United by signing Arsenal defender Viv Anderson, Celtic striker Brian McClair and Norwich City defender Steve Bruce.
Liverpool sign Watford and England winger John Barnes for £900,000, and replace Ian Rush with Oxford United's John Aldridge for £750,000.

1986
England are eliminated from the 1986 FIFA World Cup in the quarter-finals after losing 2–1 to Argentina, whose first goal had been an obviously deliberate handball by Diego Maradona – an act which he quickly labeled the Hand of God goal. Argentina go on to win the competition.
Liverpool win the league championship and FA Cup double in Kenny Dalglish's first season as player-manager, after Everton throw away their huge advantage in the closing weeks of the season.
Liverpool sell Ian Rush to Juventus of Italy for £3.2 million, but keep him for a season on loan.
Sir Stanley Rous, one of the Football Association's most prominent administrators, dies at the age of 90. Shortly after his death, a stand at Watford's Vicarage Road stadium is to be named in his honour.
Wimbledon are promoted to the First Division in only their ninth season as a Football League club.
Wolverhampton Wanderers complete a hat trick of successive relegations to fall into the Fourth Division for the first time in their history.
Terry Venables signs two English based strikers for Spanish club FC Barcelona – Mark Hughes from Manchester United for £2.2million and Gary Lineker from Everton for £2.7million.
Oxford United survive their first season in the First Division and also win the Football League Cup.
Wimbledon, who only joined the Football League nine years ago, win promotion to the First Division to complete a four-year rise from the Fourth Division.
Swindon Town, Fourth Division champions, set a new Football League record of 102 points.
Wolverhampton Wanderers suffer a third successive relegation and fall into the Fourth Division, but are saved from going out of business by a new takeover deal, as are Middlesbrough after relegation to the Third Division.
West Ham United finish a club-best third in the league and are just four points behind champions Liverpool.
Manchester United manager Ron Atkinson is sacked in November after a poor start to the season, instantly replaced by the successful Aberdeen manager Alex Ferguson.

1985
 Everton win their 8th league title with 5 league games to spare, they then take their foot off the gas to lose 3 of their last 5 but still set a club record points total.
56 spectators are burnt to death and more than 200 are injured in a fire at Bradford City's Valley Parade stadium on 11 May.
39 spectators, most of them Italian, are trampled to death in rioting on the terraces of the Heysel Stadium at the European Cup final between Liverpool and Juventus. Despite the carnage, the match is played and Juventus win 1–0. The sequel of the tragedy was a 5-year ban on English clubs from European competition, with a 6-year ban on Liverpool.
Everton establish themselves as one of the strongest club sides in Europe after winning the league championship with four matches to spare and adding the Cup Winners' Cup to their trophy cabinet.
Anton Johnson is banned from football for life after it is revealed that he had illegally taken control of two football clubs (Southend United and Rotherham United) at the same time and had also mishandled the finances of both clubs.
Preston North End and Burnley are both relegated to the Fourth Division for the first time.
16 years old Matthew Le Tissier finishes a trial at Oxford United and signs for Southampton.
Oxford United promoted to the top flight, after claiming the Second Division championship, a year after they won the Third Division championship in 1984, the only club to have won two consecutive championships on the way to the Top Flight.
A 14-year-old boy is crushed to death by a collapsed wall when Leeds United fans riot on the last game of the Second Division season at Birmingham City, but media coverage and public attention of the tragedy is overshadowed as it occurred on the same afternoon as the Bradford City fire.
Harry Catterick, who managed Everton to league title glory in 1963 and 1970 as well as an FA Cup triumph in 1966, dies from a heart attack while watching their FA Cup quarter-final win over Ipswich Town at Goodison Park.

1984
Liverpool become the first English club to win three major competitions in the same season when they win the league championship, the League Cup and the European Cup in Joe Fagan's first season as manager.
Tottenham Hotspur win the UEFA Cup.
Everton beat Watford in the FA Cup final to win their first major trophy under the management of Howard Kendall.
Kevin Keegan calls time on his playing career after helping Newcastle United win promotion to the First Division.
Ian Rush is voted Footballer of the Year by the FWA after scoring 32 goals to help Liverpool win their third successive league title.
Terry Venables signs Tottenham player Steve Archibald for Spanish club FC Barcelona for £1.15million.
Tony Barton is sacked after two-and-a-half years as manager of Aston Villa. He had won the European Cup just three months after being appointed. Villa replace him with Shrewsbury Town's manager Graham Turner.
Southampton finish a club-best second place in the First Division.
Sheffield Wednesday return to the First Division after 14 years away.
Manchester United sell England midfielder Ray Wilkins to A.C. Milan of Italy for £1.5million and replace him with Scotland and Aberdeen's Gordon Strachan for £500,000.

1983
The Football Association and then Scottish Football Association initiate the end of the British Home Championships by announcing they will not enter after the 1983–84 competition.
Liverpool retain both the League Cup and league title.
Manchester United beat Brighton & Hove Albion 4–0 in the FA Cup replay after a 2–2 draw in the first match to win their first major trophy under the management of Ron Atkinson.
Watford finish second in the league at the end of their first season in the First Division.
The Football Association keep faith in England manager Bobby Robson despite the country's failure to qualify for the 1984 European Football Championship.
Bob Paisley retires after nine years as Liverpool manager. He finishes on a high with the league championship and League Cup to bring his tally of major prizes to an English record of 21. His successor is 62-year-old coach Joe Fagan.
Sharp Electronics become the first official sponsors of Manchester United.
Manchester United and England winger Steve Coppell retires from playing at the age of 28 due to a knee injury.

1982
Ron Greenwood retires as England manager after the 1982 FIFA World Cup, which was won by Italy. He is replaced by Ipswich Town manager Bobby Robson.
Liverpool win their thirteenth League championship, and their second League Cup title.
Just three months after stepping up from the coaching staff to replace Ron Saunders, Tony Barton guides Aston Villa to glory in the European Cup – they beat Bayern Munich 1–0 thanks to a Peter Withe goal.
JVC Electronics become the first official sponsors of Arsenal.
Tottenham Hotspur beat Queens Park Rangers – managed by former Tottenham midfielder Terry Venables – to win the FA Cup for the second year running. However, Argentine players Ossie Ardiles and Ricardo Villa miss the final due to hostility from fans over the Falklands War.
Swansea City finish sixth in their first season as a First Division club, after having topped the league on several occasions.
Watford win promotion to the First Division for the first time in their history.
Bristol City declared bankruptcy and reform under a new company, BCFC 1982.

1981
The Football League begins awarding three points for a win instead of two.
Aston Villa win their first league championship for 71 years.
Ipswich Town join the list of triumphant English clubs in Europe by winning the UEFA Cup.
Liverpool win their third European Cup and their first-ever League Cup in a season where they had failed to make a serious bid for the league title.
Tottenham Hotspur win the FA Cup
Bill Shankly dies of a heart attack aged 68, seven years after he retired as Liverpool manager.
Ron Atkinson replaces Dave Sexton as manager of Manchester United. Three months after his appointment, West Bromwich Albion midfielder, Bryan Robson, follows his old manager to Old Trafford for an English record fee of £1.75million.

1980
Liverpool win a second consecutive league championship.
Nottingham Forest retain their European Cup crown, making them the only team to have won more European Cups than league titles.
Manchester United chairman Louis Edwards, 65, dies of a heart attack weeks after being accused of financial irregularities by ITV. Control of the club passes to his son Martin.
West Ham beat Arsenal in the FA Cup final to become the third Second Division team in eight years to win the trophy thanks to a Trevor Brooking goal.
Dixie Dean, who scored 60 goals for Everton during the 1927–28 season, dies of a heart attack at the age of 73 while watching an Everton v Liverpool game at Goodison Park on 1 March.
Emlyn Hughes, who had achieved numerous successes with Liverpool before his transfer to Wolves in 1979, added the League Cup to his list of honours after helping them overcome Nottingham Forest in the final.

1970s
1979 – 1978 – 1977 – 1976 – 1975 – 1974 – 1973 – 1972 – 1971 – 1970

1979
Nottingham Forest lose their defence of the league title to Liverpool but compensate by winning the European Cup.
One of Nottingham Forest's key players in the European triumph is Trevor Francis, who four months earlier had signed from Birmingham City and became Britain's first million-pound footballer.
Arsenal overcome a late revival by Manchester United to win 3–2 in the FA Cup final – their first major trophy since Terry Neill replaced Bertie Mee as manager.
West Bromwich Albion finish third in the league with a side containing three black players – Laurie Cunningham, Cyrille Regis and Brendan Batson – who were known as The Three Degrees. Ron Atkinson's side had achieved a famous 5–3 away win over Manchester United on 29 December to put pressure on the title race.
Danny Blanchflower's short-lived and unsuccessful reign as manager of Chelsea comes to an end after the club suffers relegation to the Second Division.
Brighton & Hove Albion are promoted to the top flight for the first time in their history.

1978
Newly promoted Nottingham Forest win the league title and League Cup for the first time in their history. As of 2021–22 they are the last newly promoted club to become league champions.
Ipswich Town win the FA Cup for the first time in their history.
West Bromwich Albion appoint Cambridge United's Ron Atkinson as manager.
Wigan Athletic are elected to the Football League in place of Southport
Tottenham Hotspur, back in the First Division after a one-year absence, sign two Argentine World Cup winners – Osvaldo Ardiles and Ricardo Villa – for a combined fee of £750,000.
Liverpool become the first British club to retain the European cup by defeating FC Bruges 1–0 at Wembley through a Kenny Dalglish strike.

1977
Tommy Docherty is sacked as manager of Manchester United just weeks after guiding them to FA Cup victory over Liverpool. He is replaced by Dave Sexton.
Liverpool establish themselves as one of Europe's finest sides by retaining the league title and joining the list of European Cup winners.
Aston Villa win their second League Cup in three years. 19-year-old striker Andy Gray is voted PFA Player of the Year and PFA Young Player of the Year. He was the only player to have won both in the same season, until Cristiano Ronaldo in 2006–7.
Peter Houseman, who played in Chelsea's FA Cup and Cup Winners' Cup winning teams of 1970 and 1971, is killed in a car crash near Oxford at the age of 31 along with his wife.
Wimbledon are elected to the Football League in place of Workington.
Kenny Dalglish joins Liverpool at a record £440,000 to replace Kevin Keegan who leaves to join Hamburg in Germany.
After a 2–1 victory to Scotland against England in the British Home Championship at Wembley Stadium, the Tartan Army invade the pitch, breaking goalposts and helping themselves to some of Wembley's turf.

1976
Liverpool win the league championship for a record 9th time to end manager Bob Paisley's two-year quest to bring a major trophy to Anfield.
Southampton beat Manchester United 1–0 in the FA Cup final thanks to a goal from Bobby Stokes.
Pop star Elton John becomes the new chairman of Fourth Division Watford and appoints Lincoln City manager Graham Taylor as manager.
Queens Park Rangers finish league runners-up to achieve their highest-ever league position.
Bertie Mee retires as manager of Arsenal and is replaced by Terry Neill.

1975
Derby County, in Dave Mackay's first full season as manager, win their second league title in four years to add to the 1972 championship which had been won by Mackay's predecessor, Brian Clough.
John Lyall ends his first season as West Ham manager with an FA Cup triumph at the expense of Fulham, whose side included former West Ham captain Bobby Moore.
Carlisle United, who had topped the 1974–75 First Division after three games, are relegated after failing to put together a consistent run of good form in their first season as a top division club.
Manchester United are promoted back to the First Division one season after losing their top-flight status.
Aston Villa re-establish themselves a top English side by winning the League Cup and gaining promotion to the First Division in the same season.

1974
The Football Association scraps the distinction between professional and amateur players leading to no more UK teams being entered for the Olympics.
Sir Alf Ramsay pays for England's failure to qualify for the World Cup with his job. He is succeeded by Leeds United manager Don Revie.
Liverpool win the FA Cup for a second time after an emphatic victory over Newcastle United.
Leeds United are league champions in their final season under Don Revie's management. Former Derby County manager Brian Clough is appointed but leaves after 44 days and is, in turn, replaced by Jimmy Armfield.
George Best finally leaves Manchester United after three years of uncertainty fuelled by off-the-field problems. He joins Stockport County.
Bill Shankly retires after 15 glorious years as Liverpool manager and is replaced by 55-year-old coach Bob Paisley.
Manchester United are relegated to the Second Division for the first time since the 1930s. Their fate is ironically sealed when former player Denis Law scores the winning goal for Manchester City at Old Trafford with his final touch in league football, but Birmingham City's victory would have condemned them to relegation regardless of the outcome of United's game.
Former Football League side Bradford Park Avenue go into liquidation and are reformed as a Sunday league side.
Liverpool win the first FA Charity Shield match to be decided by a penalty shootout, and the first to be played at Wembley Stadium.

1973
An Ian Porterfield goal gives Second Division Sunderland a shock win over Leeds United in the FA Cup final.
Leeds United also blow their title chances and Liverpool are crowned league champions instead.
Bobby Charlton and Denis Law both leave Manchester United after long and illustrious careers.
The Football League announces that three clubs, instead of two, are to be relegated from the First and Second Divisions from the end of the 1973–74 season onwards, with three clubs being promoted to the Second and Third Divisions. The four-up, four-down system between the Third and Fourth Divisions would continue.
Hereford United end their first season as a Football League club by winning promotion from the Fourth Division.

1972
Stoke City win the League Cup to record the first major trophy of their history.
Derby County, managed by 37-year-old Brian Clough, win the first league championship of their history.
Tottenham Hotspur win the UEFA Cup, becoming the first British team to win two European trophies.
Leeds United win the FA Cup for the first time adding it to their growing list of honours.
Manchester United sack manager Frank O'Farrell and replace him with Scottish national coach Tommy Docherty.
Hereford United, four months after achieving a shock win over Newcastle United in the FA Cup, are elected to the Football League in favour of Barrow.

1971
Arsenal become the fourth English club to win the league championship and FA Cup double.
20 years old Kevin Keegan leaves Scunthorpe United to join Liverpool for £35,000.
Leeds United win the last-ever Inter Cities Fairs Cup before the competition is abolished and replaced with the UEFA Cup.
Chelsea beat Real Madrid in the European Cup Winners' Cup final to claim their first European trophy.
Manchester United appoint Leicester City's Frank O'Farrell as their permanent successor to Wilf McGuinness.
Alvechurch progress to the First Round of the FA Cup after taking Oxford City to a record six replays in the qualifying round.

1970
England lose their defence of the World Cup to Brazil.
Everton win the league title, one short of the record number of points
Wilf McGuinness is sacked just before the turn of 1971 after 18 months in charge of Manchester United. Sir Matt Busby takes control of first-team affairs until the end of the season.
The FA Cup final goes to a replay for the first time. Chelsea beat Leeds United 2–1 at Old Trafford after drawing 2–2 in the first game at Wembley.
Cambridge United are elected to the Football League in place of Bradford Park Avenue.
In the Bogotá Bracelet incident Bobby Moore is accused of stealing a bracelet while in Colombia with the England squad for the 1970 FIFA World Cup, but all charges are quickly dropped.

1960s
1969 – 1968 – 1967 – 1966 – 1965 – 1964 – 1963 – 1962 – 1961 – 1960

1969
Leeds United win the first league championship of their history.
Manchester City continue their run of success under the management of Joe Mercer by winning the FA Cup.
Sir Matt Busby retires after 24 years as manager of Manchester United and is replaced by 32-year-old reserve team coach Wilf McGuinness, a surprise choice after big names like Don Revie and Jock Stein had been linked with the job.
Newcastle United win the European Fairs Cup to end their 14-year wait for a major trophy.
Dave Mackay and Tony Book are joint winners of the Football Writers Association (FWA) Player of the Year award.

1968
For the first time two English teams win European Competitions in the same season (info below)
Manchester United beat Benfica 4–1 in extra time at Wembley to win the European Cup with goals from Bobby Charlton twice, George Best and 19-year-old Brian Kidd- who was covering for the injured Denis Law.
Leeds United win the first major trophies in their history picking up the Football League Cup against Arsenal 1–0 and the Inter-Cities Fairs Cup 1–0 on aggregate against Ferencvárosi TC.
The blue half of Manchester also celebrates after winning the league championship for only the second time in their history.
A Jeff Astle goal against Everton in the FA Cup final gives West Bromwich Albion their fifth triumph in the history of the competition.
George Best, 22, is voted European Footballer of the Year after a brilliant season which was rounded off by scoring a goal in the European Cup final.
Matt Busby is knighted after guiding Manchester United to the European Cup title.

1967
Manchester United win the league championship – their fifth under Matt Busby and their seventh of all time, and last for the next 26 years, until the formation of the Premier League.
Tottenham Hotspur beat Chelsea 2–1 in the FA Cup final.
Queens Park Rangers beat West Bromwich Albion in the first one-game League Cup final.
Goalkeeper Harry Gregg leaves Manchester United after 10 years during which he established himself as one of the best goalkeepers in the English game, but with no medals to show for it: he had missed the 1963 FA Cup final due to injury and had not played enough games to qualify for a medal when United won the league in 1965 and 1967.
Coventry City, managed by Jimmy Hill, win the Second Division championship and are promoted to the First Division for the first time in their history.

1966
England win the 1966 FIFA World Cup 4–2 against West Germany in extra time as Geoff Hurst becomes the first man to score a hat-trick in a World Cup final, with two of his goals being controversial. Martin Peters also scores for England.
Alf Ramsey receives a knighthood for inspiring England's World Cup glory.
Everton win the FA Cup after beating Sheffield Wednesday 3–2 in the final at Wembley.
Manchester United lose the defence of the league championship trophy to Liverpool.
Manchester United's Bobby Charlton was voted European Footballer of the Year.

1965
Manchester United win their first post Munich Air Disaster league championship.
Liverpool win the FA Cup for the first time in their history.
West Ham won the European Cup Winners' Cup to bring the total of English clubs winning European trophies to two.
Eric Brook, all-time record goalscorer for Manchester City, dies at the age of 57.
Stanley Matthews plays his last game for Stoke City at the age of 50 and collects a knighthood shortly afterward.

1964
Match of the Day makes its debut on BBC2 at 6.30pm on 22 August with highlights of Liverpool's 3–2 home win over Arsenal. Kenneth Wolstenholme is both presenter and commentator to an audience of just 20,000.
Liverpool win the league championship to claim their first major trophy under the management of Bill Shankly.
West Ham win the FA Cup to claim the first major trophy in their history.
Tottenham Hotspur inside-forward John White is struck by lightning on a North London golf course and dies instantly at the age of 27.
Tottenham Hotspur captain Danny Blanchflower retires as a player at the age of 37 after failing to overcome a serious knee injury.

1963
Tottenham Hotspur win the Cup Winners' Cup to establish themselves as the first English club to win a European competition.
Everton win their first league championship of the postwar years.
Manchester United win the FA Cup for the first time in 15 years. It is their first major trophy since the Munich Air Disaster five years earlier.
Birmingham City beat Aston Villa 3–1 on aggregate in the League Cup final to win the first major trophy of their history.
1911 FA Cup winners Bradford City finish second from bottom in the Fourth Division and have to seek re-election in order to preserve their Football League place.

1962
Tottenham Hotspur beat Burnley (also league runners-up) at Wembley to retain the FA Cup.
Norwich City beat Rochdale 4–0 on aggregate to win the League Cup – the first major trophy of their history.
Ipswich Town are crowned league champions in their first season as a First Division club.
Walter Winterbottom retires after 16 years as England manager and is replaced by Ipswich Town manager, Alf Ramsey.
Accrington Stanley resign from the Football League in March and their Fourth Division records are expunged. Their place in the league for 1962–63 is given to Southern Football League champions Oxford United.

1961
Tottenham Hotspur become the first club of the 20th century to win the league championship and FA Cup double.
Aston Villa played Rotherham United in the first-ever League Cup final. The second leg of the final is withheld until the 1961–62 season due to fixture congestion.
Leeds United appoint former Leicester City and Manchester City player Don Revie, 33, as their new player-manager.
Manchester City sell 21-year-old Scottish striker Denis Law to Torino of Italy in the first £100,000 deal involving a British club.
Terry Bly scores 52 league goals for Peterborough United as they complete their first league season as Fourth Division champions.

1960
Burnley overcome a spirited challenge of 106-goal Wolves to win the league championship.
Wolves compensate for their league championship disappointment by overcoming Blackburn Rovers in the FA Cup final.
Oldham Athletic, league runners-up 45 years earlier, finish second from bottom in the Fourth Division but retain their league status after the Football League's members vote for Gateshead to go down and Midland League champions Peterborough United to go up for the 1960–61 season.
former Arsenal and Sunderland player Charlie Buchan dies at the age of 68.
Aston Villa win the Second Division championship to regain their First Division status a year after losing it.

1950s
1959 – 1958 – 1957 – 1956 – 1955 – 1954 – 1953

1959
Bill Shankly is appointed manager of Liverpool
Wolves retain the league championship despite a spirited challenge from a new-look Manchester United.
Nottingham Forest win the FA Cup for the first time since 1898.
Port Vale win the first-ever Fourth Division championship after scoring 110 league goals.
Billy Wright becomes the first player to play 100 times for England.
Birmingham City and England full-back Jeff Hall dies at the age of 29.

1958

Eight Manchester United players die and two more have their careers ended by injury after a plane crash near Munich-Riem Airport. Manager Matt Busby is badly injured and spends two months in hospital recovering from multiple injuries.
A makeshift Manchester United side reach the FA Cup Final, but lose 2–0 to Bolton.
Wolves win the league championship for the second time and qualify for the European Cup for the first time.
Sunderland are relegated from the First Division for the first time, having been in the top division every season since joining the Football League in 1890.
Former Manchester United and Manchester City winger Billy Meredith dies aged 83.

1957

Manchester United win the league title for the second year running.
Aston Villa beat Manchester United 2–1 in the FA Cup final to win the trophy for a record seventh time. Their victory denies United the double, meaning Villa are still the last team to achieve the feat, back in 1896–97.
Stanley Matthews retires from international football at the age of 42, but continues his club career with Blackpool.
Charlton Athletic turn the tables on Huddersfield Town during the final 20 minutes of a Second Division fixture by turning a 5–1 deficit into a 7–6 lead.
Eastbourne United manager Ron Greenwood, 36, is appointed first-team coach of Arsenal.

1956

Manchester United win the league championship with a reshaped side containing mostly young players including Duncan Edwards (19), David Pegg (20), Albert Scanlon (20) and Mark Jones (22).  They become England's first representatives in the European Cup, in the competition's second season, as the previous league champions Chelsea were blocked from entering the inaugural tournament by the Football Association.
German goalkeeper Bert Trautmann plays through Manchester City's FA Cup victory over Birmingham City despite suffering what an X-ray later confirms as a broken neck, and was able to continue his career.
The top three sides in the Third Division South – Leyton Orient, Brighton & Hove Albion and Ipswich Town – all score over 100 league goals.

1955

Chelsea win the league championship for the first time in their history.
Blackburn Rovers score 106 Second Division goals but concede 79 times and sixth place is not high enough for promotion to the First Division.
Newcastle United win the FA Cup after beating Manchester City 3–1 at Wembley.
Duncan Edwards, 18-year-old Manchester United wing-half, becomes England's youngest international when he plays in a side containing 40-year-old Stanley Matthews, who had played for England before Edwards was born.

1954

Wolves win the league title for the first time in their history.
West Bromwich Albion complete a double for clubs in central England by winning the FA Cup for the fourth time in their history.
Everton finish Second Division runners-up, are promoted to the First Division and have remained there ever since.
Bournemouth & Boscombe Athletic and Swindon Town are bracketed together in 19th place in the Third Division South having both accumulated 40 league points, scored 67 goals and conceded 70 goals.

1953

38-year-old Stanley Matthews is instrumental in turning Blackpool's 3–1 deficit into a 4–3 victory against Bolton Wanderers in the FA Cup final, ending his 20-year hunt for a major trophy.  The final is still widely known as the 'Matthews Final', despite the fact that his teammate Stan Mortensen scored a hat-trick in the game.
Arsenal win a record-breaking seventh league title with a superior goal difference over Preston North End, who also have 54 points and have not won the league title since 1890.
England's unbeaten home record against a non-British nation ends when they lose 6–3 then Hungarian Aranycsapat at Wembley.

1952
Manchester United win their first top-flight title in 41 years under the guidance of Matt Busby.
Newcastle United become one of a few teams to win the FA Cup two years in succession.

1951
Tottenham Hotspur win the First Division for the first time in their history, only a season after their promotion.

1950
Portsmouth defend their league title on goal average after finishing level on points with Wolverhampton Wanderers.

1940s

1949
Portsmouth win their first league title, 10 years after winning the FA Cup.

1948

83,260 watch Manchester United vs Arsenal at Maine Road on 17 January to become the highest attendance at an English league game.
Manchester United end a 37-year trophy drought after beating Blackpool to win the FA Cup.
Arsenal win the top flight title.

1947
After a close three-horse title race, Liverpool win the first post-war league championship.
Charlton Athletic win the FA Cup, their first and only major trophy to date.

1946
Football League North (Wartime – Joint Division One League with Football League South)
Champions: Sheffield United
Derby County become the first team to win the FA Cup after losing a game when two-legged games are introduced for one season only.
League football resumes following the end of the Second World War.
The Football Association end their boycott of FIFA, paving the way for England to play in World Cup matches.

1930s

1939
The Football League is abandoned three games into the new season after the outbreak of the Second World War
Portsmouth beat Wolverhampton Wanderers 4–1 in the FA Cup final.

1938
Manchester City become the first and only defending Champions to be relegated.

1937
Manchester City win their first-ever league title.
Sunderland win the FA Cup for the first time.

1936
Sunderland A.F.C. win their 6th league championship.
Founding Football League members, Aston Villa and Blackburn Rovers are relegated to the second division.

1935
Arsenal win their third successive league title.

1934
Arsenal and Huddersfield Town's manager Herbert Chapman dies of pneumonia on 6 January.
84,569 watch Manchester City defeat Stoke City at Maine Road in the FA Cup 6th Round, the biggest crowd ever recorded for an English game outside of Wembley Stadium.

1932
Everton win the league championship after a year's absence from the First Division.
Newcastle United win their third FA Cup trophy.

1931
Aston Villa set an all-time top-flight record of 128 goals in a season, but still finish runners-up to Arsenal by 7 points.
Second division West Bromwich Albion win the FA Cup.

1930
Sheffield Wednesday defend their league championship, winning their fourth league title.
Arsenal win their first ever major trophy, the FA Cup.
Everton are relegated for the first time, just two years after being crowned top flight league champions.

1920s

1929
 Sheffield Wednesday win the league championship by a point.
Bolton Wanderers win the FA Cup for the third time.

1928
Arsenal and Chelsea are the first clubs to play with shirt numbers on 25 August.
Dixie Dean becomes the first and only player to score 60 goals in one season in English football, helping Everton to win the top flight title.
Blackburn Rovers equal Aston Villa's record of six FA Cup wins.

1927
 Newcastle United win their fourth and last top-flight title to date.
FA Cup: Cardiff City 1 Arsenal 0
The FA Cup is won by a team outside England for the first time prompting it to become known as the FA Cup rather than the English Cup as previously.

1926
Huddersfield Town become the first team to be the Football League champions three seasons in succession.

1925
FA Cup: Sheffield United 1–0 Cardiff City
Sheffield United F.C win the FA Cup, their last major trophy to this day. Runners-Up Cardiff City
The offside rule is changed: a player is now onside if a minimum of two (instead of three) opposing players are between him and the goal line.

1924
Huddersfield Town win the league for the first time. 
FA Cup: Corinthian 1-0 Blackburn Rovers
A major shock in the first round as five times Cup winners, and First Division staple, Blackburn Rovers, are unexpectedly beaten by the amateurs of Corinthian F.C. at the Crystal Palace.
Newcastle United beat Aston Villa to win the FA Cup in what became known as the "Rainy Day Final" due to the weather and pitch conditions.

1923
Liverpool win a second consecutive league championship, a fourth in total.
Bolton Wanderers defeat West Ham United 2–0 in the first FA Cup final to be held at Wembley.  The match kicked off 44 minutes late due to overcrowding – there was an estimated 200,000 fans in attendance, and it was not until a police constable on a white police horse helped clear the pitch that the match took place.  As a result, the match is now known as the White Horse Final.
Aston Villa centre-half Tommy Ball is shot dead by his neighbour in November thus becoming the only Football League player to have been murdered.

1921
The Football League is increased to 92 clubs with the Third Division becoming the Third Division South and the introduction of 24 new clubs in the Third Division North.
Burnley win their first top flight title, going a record 30 matches unbeaten

1920
The Southern League's top division is absorbed into the Football League creating the Football League Third Division
Aston Villa capture the FA Cup for a record sixth time.

1910s

1919
Leeds City are expelled and dissolved by the football league after financial irregularities including the payment of players during the First World War.  In its place, a new club is formed, Leeds United.

1915
Everton win the final league title before league football is suspended because of the First World War.
FA Cup Final: Sheffield United	3–0 Chelsea
Sheffield United F.C win the FA Cup.

1914
Blackburn Rovers win their second league title and their second in three seasons.

1913
Sunderland A.F.C. beat Aston Villa to win their 5th league championship.
Aston Villa defeat Sunderland to win the FA Cup.

1912
Blackburn Rovers succeed in winning their first league title.

1911
Bradford City win the FA Cup, its only major honour.

1910
Aston Villa win the league championship for a record sixth time.
Brighton & Hove Albion, champions of the Southern Football League, defeat Aston Villa, Football League champions, to win the 1910 FA Charity Shield, their only top-flight honour to date.
Millwall leave East London, relocating to The Den in South London.

1900s

1909
The Charity Shield is inaugurated.
Manchester United win their first-ever FA Cup title.

1908
Manchester United F.C. win their first league championship.
The United Kingdom national football team, then competing under the name Great Britain and Ireland, win the gold medal in the first official football tournament at the 1908 Summer Olympics.
Second division Wolverhampton Wanderers upset the odds by beating previous season's league champions Newcastle United in the FA Cup final.

1907
The action by the Football Association in 1885 leads to the breakaway and formation of the Amateur Football Association.
Professional Footballers' Association formed.

1906
Liverpool F.C. win their second league championship
Everton win the FA Cup for the first time.

1905
Norwich City FC ousted from amateur football and deemed a professional organisation by the FA
Alf Common becomes the first £1,000 transfer when he moves from Sunderland to Middlesbrough.
Chelsea Football Club is founded at The Rising Sun pub (now The Butcher's Hook), Fulham Road, London, on 14 March and like Bradford City in 1903 are immediately elected to the league.
Aston Villa win the FA Cup.
Crystal Palace is founded on 10 September by workers at Joseph Paxton's famous Crystal Palace, in Sydenham.

1904
Sheffield Wednesday win their first-ever league championship.
Manchester City win the FA Cup.

1903
Bradford City are elected to the Football League before they have ever played a game.

1902
Norwich City FC formed as an amateur club
Sunderland A.F.C. wins their 4th league championship
J.H. Davies takes over near bankrupt Newton Heath (L&YR) F.C. and changes its name to Manchester United.
Sheffield United win the FA Cup. Runners Up: Southampton
Sheffield United	1–1	Southampton – (R)	Sheffield United	2–1	Southampton

1901

Tottenham Hotspur become the first non-league club to win the FA Cup. Runners Up: Sheffield United F.C
Tottenham Hotspur	2–2	Sheffield United – (R)	Tottenham Hotspur	3–1	Sheffield United
Liverpool F.C. win their first league title.

1900
Aston Villa win the league championship, their fifth title in seven years.
Sheffield United F.C Finish 2nd.
Sunderland Finish 3rd.
Leading Goalscorer Billy Garraty (Aston Villa) 27
Brighton & Hove Albion are founded.

1890s

1899
Aston Villa win the last championship of the 1800s, defeating runners-up Liverpool F.C. 5–0 in the last match to secure the title.
Sheffield United F.C Win the FA Cup. Runners Up Derby County.
 Scunthorpe United F.C. are formed.

1898

Sheffield United F.C secure the league title for the first time and only time.
Sunderland Finish 2nd.
Wolverhampton Wanderers Finish 3rd.
Leading Goalscorer Fred Wheldon (Aston Villa) 21
Portsmouth F.C is formed.

1897
Aston Villa capture their third league title and the FA Cup to win the second Double in English football. 
Sheffield United Finish 2nd.
Derby County Finish 3rd.
Leading Goalscorer: Steve Bloomer (Derby County) 22

1896
Aston Villa capture the league title.

1895
Sunderland A.F.C. become the first team to win the league championship 3 times.
Aston Villa win the FA Cup. The Cup is then stolen from the window of a shop in Aston, Birmingham and never found. A replacement is made.
Thames Ironworks F.C. are formed as the works team of the Thames Ironworks and Shipbuilding Company. The club would later be reformed as West Ham United.

1894
Aston Villa win their first league championship. Later that year though their former captain Archie Hunter dies aged just 35.
Formerly St Mark's West Gorton and Aldwick Association FC are renamed Manchester City.

1893
Sunderland A.F.C. retain League Championship

1892
Sunderland A.F.C. win their 1st League Championship
Expansion of the Football League to two divisions.
John Houlding, owner of Anfield, founds Liverpool Football Club on 15 March.
West Bromwich Albion defeat Aston Villa in the FA Cup final. There are suspicions over the performance of Villa keeper Jimmy Warner. His pub in burned down by a mob and he never plays for the club again.

1891
Everton win their first league championship.
Luton Town become the south of England's first professional club in August – paying the entire team 2 shillings and sixpence plus expenses.
The penalty kick is introduced.
Assistant referees are first introduced as linesmen.

1890
Luton Town player Frank Whitby becomes the first professional player in the south of England on 15 December, earning 5 shillings per week.

1880s

1889

Preston North End complete the first season of the Football League as unbeaten champions. They also become the first team to win the 'double', gaining the FA Cup without conceding a goal.
Sheffield United is formed.

1888
The oldest professional league in the world,The Football League is established by Aston Villa director William McGregor

1887
Aston Villa win their first FA Cup and the first Midland winners.

1886
Blackburn Rovers win the FA Cup for a third year in a row.
Plymouth Argyle F.C are founded.
Dial Square are founded, the team who went on to become Arsenal.

1885
The threat of secession leads to the legalisation of professionalism on 20 July by the Football Association making the British Football Association redundant.
Luton Town, Millwall Rovers and Southampton founded.

1884
Preston North End are suspended for one year from the FA Cup for paying players.
Rules attempting to restrict professionalism, such as only Englishmen being allowed to play in the FA Cup, lead to the formation of the British Football Association as a rival to the Football Association.

1883
The British Home Championship (also known as the Home International Championship) becomes an annual competition contested between the UK's four national teams, England, Scotland, Wales and Northern Ireland (Ireland before the late 1970s).
Accrington are expelled from the Football Association for paying players.
 Bristol Rovers F.C. are formed.

1882
The Football Association (England), the Scottish Football Association, the Football Association of Wales and the Irish Football Association meet on 6 December and agree on one uniform set of rules for football. They also establish the International Football Association Board (IFAB) to approve changes to the rules (a task that they still perform to this day).
Burnley F.C. are formed
Hotspur Football Club is formed (later to become Tottenham Hotspur).

1880
St'Marks (West Gorton) are formed in Manchester.

1870s

1879
Doncaster Rovers are formed.
Sunderland A.F.C. are formed.

1878

First floodlit football match played at Bramall Lane, Sheffield on 14 October 1878 in front of an attendance of 20,000.
Newton Heath LYR Football Club was formed by the Carriage and Wagon department of the Lancashire and Yorkshire Railway depot at Newton Heath (later known as Manchester United Football Club).
St Domingo's FC is formed, later changing its name in November 1879 – to Everton.

1876
Middlesbrough Football Club is formed.
Birmingham Senior Cup, the first Association tournament on a local level, commences.

1875
The crossbar is introduced, replacing tape as the means of marking the top of the goal.
Birmingham City are formed, under the name Small Heath Alliance.
Blackburn Rovers Football Club are formed.

1874
Aston Villa Football Club is formed by 15 members of the Aston Villa Wesleyan Chapel, in Lozells, nr. Aston, Warwks.
Bolton Wanderers F.C. are formed.

1873
The Calthorpe football club is formed, as the first club in Birmingham playing solely to the Association laws.

1872
Scotland and England draw 0–0, played at the West of Scotland Cricket Club. This is recognised by FIFA as the first official international match.
Wanderers beat Royal Engineers in the first FA Cup final.

1871
Charles William Alcock creates the Football Association Challenge Cup and the first FA Cup tournament takes place.
Old Etonians F.C. formed.
Southall F.C. formed.
Uxbridge F.C. formed.
Reading F.C. formed.
 The South Derbyshire Football Association was established in March 1871

1870
First "goalkeepers", and transition from "dribbling game" to "passing game" is seen in club matches in Sheffield and London.
A match between England and Scotland, finishes in a 1–0 win for England at the Kennington Oval in London. This was the first match between the nations but is not recognised as being the first international (see 1872).
Maidenhead United F.C., Marlow F.C. and Abingdon F.C. are established (Maidenhead and Marlow took part in the first FA Cup tournament the following year).

1860s

1867
The first ever football tournament, the Youdan Cup, was played by twelve Sheffield clubs.
Wednesday 4 September 1867, Sheffield Wednesday Football Club was established.

1865
Nottingham Forest F.C. The oldest existing league club, established.

1863
The Football Association is founded and ratifies the original 14 rules of the game.

1862
Notts County, the oldest professional football club in the world, is formed.

1850s

1857
Sheffield F.C., the world's oldest football club, established and the Sheffield Rules developed.

1840s

1849
Official referees appear for the first time in a football match in Cheltenham, two on the pitch and one in tribune.

1848
The Cambridge Rules are created being the first attempt to establish formal rules.

1846
 A time limit on length of play is first introduced and first described in Lancashire

1845
 First use of referee in English public school football games, from Eton football

1842
 First use of referee.  During a match in Rochdale, between the Bodyguards club and the Fearnaught club

1820s

1823
 First description of a pass comes from Suffolk. In this Moor describes a team ball game with goals in which a player who can not advance further "throws the ball [he must in no case give it] to some less beleaguered friend more free and more in breath than himself".  Although this description refers to throwing, Moor tells us that the game was at other times a football one:  "Sometimes a large football was used; the game was then called 'kicking camp'."

1790s

1796
 Last meetings of The Gymnastic Society, the first football club in the world.

See also
Football in England
Football in the United Kingdom
History of association football
Timeline of association football

References

Timeline of English football
English Football
Football